Robert C. Rowe (born July 15, 1938) is a former attorney and former Republican member of the Pennsylvania House of Representatives. He was disbarred by the Pennsylvania Supreme Court on April 6, 1989 and was soon thereafter convicted of multiple counts of Forgery, Theft, Misappropriation of Entrusted Funds and Bad Checks.

References

Republican Party members of the Pennsylvania House of Representatives
Living people
1938 births